Sector 63 (popularly known as Phase 9) is an important locality in Mohali famous for sports as Punjab Cricket Association Stadium, International Hockey Stadium and Sports complex of Department of Sports is situated in this locality. The seasonal rivulet N Choe (also called Attawa Choa) passes through it.

Facilities

Administrative Offices
 Punjab Cricket Association, Headquarters
 International Hockey Stadium, Field Hockey, Headquarters

Healthcare
 Silver Oak Hospital

Religious
 Gurdwara Phase 9
 Shiva Temple

Access
Sector 63 is situated on Mohali Stadium road. It is well connected with road, rail and air. The nearest airports are Chandigarh Airport and railway station at Industrial Area - Phase 9. Auto rickshaw are easily available for commuting. A few CTU local buses also available.

References

Mohali
Sectors of Mohali